Sir David Greenaway DL (born 20 March 1952, Glasgow) is a British economist. He is professor of economics and was previously the Vice-Chancellor of the University of Nottingham, having succeeded Sir Colin Campbell on 1 October 2008. In September 2016, he announced his decision to retire, and stepped down at the end of September 2017 with Shearer West succeeding Greenaway.

Education and career

After undergraduate and graduate studies at what is now Liverpool John Moores University and the University of Liverpool respectively, he was a lecturer at what is now De Montfort University and later a professor at the University of Buckingham, before joining the University of Nottingham in 1987. From 2004 to 2008 he was a University Pro-Vice-Chancellor, having previously held this position between 1994 and 2001. He was also Dean of the Faculty of Law and Social Sciences between 1991 and 1994.

Positions
Deputy Lord Lieutenant of Nottinghamshire
Chairman of the Armed Forces Pay Review Body from 2004 until 2010, and a Member since 1998, which advises the Prime Minister and Secretary of State for Defence annually on the pay and conditions of the UK Armed Forces
Member of the Senior Salaries Review Body from 2004 until 2010, which advises the Prime Minister on the remuneration of the senior civil service, judiciary and senior military
Member of the UK Government’s Asia Task Force
 Chair of the Shape of Training review for the General Medical Council, published in 2013.

Honours
Greenaway was knighted in the 2014 Birthday Honours for services to higher education.

Other
He also provides advice to a range of Government Departments, which has included a report on Uninsured Driving in the UK for the previous Labour government Secretary of State for Transport. Greenaway is also the director of the Leverhulme Centre for Research on Globalisation and Economic Policy, which he helped establish in 1998.

References

External links
 School of Economics
 About the Vice-Chancellor, The University of Nottingham

1952 births
Living people
English economists
Vice-Chancellors of the University of Nottingham
Academics of De Montfort University
Alumni of Liverpool John Moores University
People from Nottingham
People educated at Henry Mellish Grammar School
Knights Bachelor
Deputy Lieutenants of Nottinghamshire